The National Congress of Thai Labour (NCTL) is a trade union federation in Thailand. It is affiliated with the International Trade Union Confederation.

References

Trade unions in Thailand
International Trade Union Confederation